Ma Jingyi (born October 29, 1995) is a Chinese curler. She competed in the 2018 Winter Olympics.

Career

Juniors
Ma represented China at the 2015 Pacific-Asia Junior Curling Championships, playing second for the team. China went undefeated in the round robin but than lost the final 5–4 to South Korea's Kim Eun-bi.

Women's
Ma won the 2019 World Qualification Event with her team, skipped by Mei Jie which qualified them for the 2019 World Women's Curling Championship. There, they qualified for the playoffs but lost their qualification game to Switzerland's Silvana Tirinzoni who went on to win the event. She also competed at the Olympic Games in 2018 as lead for China. The team finished just outside the playoffs with a 4–5 record. Despite not qualifying for the playoffs, Ma was the third best lead during the round robin stage, finishing behind Lisa Weagle and Becca Hamilton.

Teams

References

External links

1995 births
Living people
Curlers at the 2018 Winter Olympics
Chinese female curlers
Olympic curlers of China
21st-century Chinese women
Competitors at the 2017 Winter Universiade